Nike Terminator is a high-top shoe by the multinational company Nike, Inc. introduced in 1985.

Overview
It is distinguished from the similar Nike Dunk by its unusual logo — the word "Nike" in large letters across the heel of the shoe. The Terminator also has a lace loop on the heel to facilitate wrapping the laces around the shoe; this and the logo were styles shared by other basketball shoes of the time, for example the Reebok BB5600. Colorways included white with brown, yellow, orange trim and white with gray trim.

The Vintage Terminator "Georgetown" and "Michigan" and "St. John's" have the team colors of those basketball teams. Some were specifically made for Georgetown, with "Hoyas" on the heel instead of "Nike".

The Terminator High Supreme "Thrash Metal Pack" was a special edition in a black and gold colorway.

References

Terminator, Nike